Avadi is a state assembly constituency in Tamil Nadu, India, newly formed after constituency delimitation. Its State Assembly Constituency number is 6. It consists of a portion of Avadi taluk and includes Avadi. It is included in the Thiruvallur parliamentary constituency. It is one of the 234 State Legislative Assembly Constituencies in Tamil Nadu.

Members of the Legislative Assembly

Election results

2021

2016

2011

References

Assembly constituencies of Tamil Nadu
Tiruvallur district